WKYU-TV (channel 24) is a secondary PBS member television station in Bowling Green, Kentucky, United States. Owned by Western Kentucky University as an arm of its Information Technology department, it is a sister station to NPR member network WKU Public Radio and its flagship station WKYU-FM.

WKYU-TV is a member of PBS' Program Differentiation Plan (PDP), previously known as the "Beta" group; as the Bowling Green market's secondary PBS station, it only airs 25% of the network's schedule.

History

The Broadcasting and Mass Media Department of Western Kentucky University was granted a construction permit by the Federal Communications Commission (FCC) on February 28, 1986, to build a public television station under the chosen callsign WKYU-TV to match that of its pre-existing NPR-member radio outlet WKYU-FM. Plans for the opening of the television station dated back to about ten years prior. Under the director of Dr. Chuck Anderson, the station was established as an addition to the university's extensive broadcast program that already established a network of four NPR member public radio stations in the state.

WKYU-TV would not only compete against locally-based Kentucky Educational Television (KET) station WKGB-TV (channel 53), but also be a source for locally-produced public affairs programming focusing solely on the south-central Kentucky area. The station signed on the air for the first time on January 17, 1989. Upon its inception, it became the second PBS member station within Kentucky that was separate from statewide PBS-member network KET, but then became the only one remaining in Kentucky when KET acquired Louisville's WKPC-TV in 1997.

After years of branding as "WKYU-TV" or WKYU PBS for most of its history, the station rebranded as WKU PBS in 2013, using the university's logo along with the PBS icon.

WKYU-DT2 and DT3
In 2010, WKYU-TV began airing the Create TV channel that is syndicated by American Public Television on their second digital subchannel, replacing the audio-only simulcast of WKU Public Radio. The Create TV channel features how-to programs and some cooking and travel shows, as well as PBS Newshour, which is broadcast on the DT2 subchannel in order to make room for local programming on the main channel.

Around the same time, WKYU-DT3 began featuring the National Weather Service Fort Campbell weather radar on the screen, and simulcasting NOAA Weather Radio station KIH-45, which operates on 162.400 MHz on the weather band radio dial. It was also previously simulcast on a fourth digital subchannel before the fourth subchannel was discontinued in late 2010. In 2017, the radar display was upgraded to use GRLevel3 software, discontinuing use of the web image.

Programming
WKYU-TV's program schedule consists mainly of a handful of PBS programs, including a few PBS Kids programs, as well as programs syndicated by American Public Television. Its program schedule for the day was previously posted on "Community Calendar" slides shown with audio of WKU Public Radio during that station's daily downtime from 3 to 7 a.m. CT (11 p.m. to 7 a.m. before 2012). This practice ended in 2016, when WKYU-TV began to broadcast actual programming 24 hours a day.

Notable local programming 
WKYU-TV's local programming includes public affairs programs such as:
MainStreet – a look at happenings around the region
Outlook – interview show
Coach's Corner – magazine-style program involving WKU athletics (seasonal)
Lost River Sessions – Emmy award-winning concert-style show.

WKU sports broadcasts
WKYU-TV occasionally airs Western Kentucky Hilltoppers football and men's and women's basketball games that do not appear on regional or national commercial sports networks. The games are broadcast under a banner called "Hilltopper Sports Satellite Network," for which WKYU-TV is the flagship station. Select WKU men's basketball games on WKYU-TV under that branding were previously simulcast on Fox College Sports, with the audio from the Hilltopper IMG Sports Network. As of 2018, these broadcasts were moved from Fox College Sports to Facebook Live (for exhibitions) and ESPN+. Some of WKU's games may be shown via Sinclair Broadcast Group-operated Stadium's Conference USA syndication package beginning in fall 2014 (when Stadium was known as American Sports Network); hence, WKYU-TV serves as a part-time affiliate of Stadium since Bowling Green has no television station owned by Sinclair. This often takes the form of preempting regular programming to carry the Stadium linear signal for the duration of the event.

Newscasts
WKYU-TV occasionally broadcasts replays of WKU student-produced 6 p.m. newscasts originating from WKU Cable 12, named NewsChannel 12.

Technical information

Subchannels
The station's digital signal is multiplexed:

Former digital subchannels

Analog-to-digital conversion
WKYU-TV shut down its analog signal on February 17, 2009, as part of the FCC-mandated nationwide digital transition, even though the DTV transition deadline was moved to June 12 of that year. The digital signal, which began operation in 2003, continued to be broadcast on its pre-transition channel 18, but through the use of PSIP, viewers see it displayed as virtual channel 24, the station's former analog channel number.

Availability
In addition to their over-the-air signal on UHF digital channel 18, WKYU-TV can also be seen on Dish Network channel 24. In Bowling Green, it is also carried on Charter Spectrum (formerly Time Warner Cable) channels 11 in SD and 917 in HD. In Glasgow, it is also seen on South Central Rural Telephone Cooperative (SCRTC) cable channel 24 in Barren, Hart, and Metcalfe counties, as well as on Glasgow Electric Plant Board cable channels 24 (SD) and 540 (HD).

WKYU-DT2 is also available to cable subscribers in Bowling Green and Glasgow, as well as other areas served by the SCRTC. WKYU's main channel is also widely carried on Mediacom cable in several areas within and just outside the Bowling Green DMA. These include areas of Butler, Edmonson, Hart, and Metcalfe counties, as well as the northwest Barren County city of Park City. WKYU-TV is also available on via channel 7 on WesternCable, WKU's cable system available to all classrooms and residence halls on campus.

Out-of-market coverage
In the neighboring Nashville DMA (home territory to fellow PBS member stations WNPT and Cookeville, Tennessee's WCTE), it is available to Mediacom customers in Clinton, Cumberland (including Burkesville), and Monroe counties, and for all SCRTC customers in the cooperative's service area regardless of location. WKYU is also available to Suddenlink Communications (now Optimum) cable customers in Logan County (including Russellville). Subscribers of North Central Telephone Cooperative Cable in Allen County and into Macon County, Tennessee, including Lafayette and Red Boiling Springs, are served by WKYU-TV, as well as the respective subchannels of WNPT and KET affiliate WKGB-TV.

WKYU is also carried in the far southern portions of the Louisville DMA, including parts of Grayson, Green, and Larue counties, along with southern portions of Hardin County, including Upton and Sonora.

WKYU is also available in Muhlenberg and Ohio counties in northwest Kentucky, in the Evansville, Indiana, DMA, home territory to fellow PBS member station WNIN), including Comcast Xfinity in the Greenville/Central City area, and on Spectrum systems in the Beaver Dam/Hartford area.

References

External links

Official website
Western Kentucky University

Western Kentucky University
Television channels and stations established in 1989
1989 establishments in Kentucky
KYU-TV
PBS member stations